Ronay or Rónay is a surname. Notable people with the surname include: 

Barney Ronay, English journalist and author
Edina Ronay (born 1943), Anglo-Hungarian fashion designer and actress
Egon Ronay (1915–2010), Anglo-Hungarian food critic
Ferenc Rónay (1900–1967), Hungarian-Romanian football player and manager
Ildikó Rónay-Matuscsák (born 1946), Hungarian fencer
Matthew Ronay (born 1976), American artist
Shebah Ronay (born 1972), English actress

given name
Ronay A. Menschel (born c. 1942), American politician